Merlin: The Quest Begins was created by Eamonn Maguire and is a 1998 television film about a young Merlin (Jason Connery) who must rescue helpless people from the evil King Vidus and his ruthless high counselor.

Cast
Jason Connery as Young Merlin
Deborah Moore as Nimue
Gareth Thomas as Blaze
Graham McTavish as Rengal
Paul Curran as Kay
Corey Haim as Wilf

Production
The idea was created by Eamonn Maguire and was filmed in 16 days in September 1997 near Peebles, Scotland.

External links

1998 television films
1998 films
American television films
Arthurian films
Films directed by David Winning
Works based on Merlin
Wizards in television
Films shot in Scotland
Films produced by Damian Lee
1990s English-language films